Every Road I Walked is an album by American jazz saxophonist and vocalist Grace Kelly.

It was released on December 1, 2006, and features three award-winning songs:
"Every Road I Walked" – 2007 ASCAP Young Jazz Composers Award and 2007 International Songwriting Competition Award
"Filosophical Flying Fish" – 2006 ISC Award
"Summertime" – Downbeat Magazine 2006 Student Music Award for Arrangement.

Track listing
"Every Road I Walked" – 5:37
"I’ll Remember April" – 5:10
"East of the Sun (West of the Moon)" – 5:12
"Some Other Time" – 4:58
"I Will" – 4:13
"Nowhere to Run" – 4:53
"'Round Midnight" – 6:43
"Filosophial Flying Fish" – 3:58
"Samba de Verao (So Nice)" – 4:05
"Somewhere Over the Rainbow" – 4:19
"Here's to That Rainy Day" – 4:49
"Finish Line" – 4:49
"What If I Told You" – 4:29
"Summertime" – 6:38

Personnel
Grace Kelly – Vocals, alto saxophone, soprano saxophone
Doug Johnson – Piano
John Lockwood – Bass
Terri Lyne Carrington – Drums

Special guests
Christian Scott – Trumpet
Adam Larrabee – Guitar
Rick McLaughlin – Bass
Jordan Perlson – Drums

Reviews
 http://allmusic.com/album/every-road-i-walked-r1028386
Positive http://www.allaboutjazz.com/php/article.php?id=24866

Receiving a 3 1/2 * review in All About Jazz and Jazz Times

References

2006 albums
Grace Kelly (musician) albums